Claudia Alina Cucerzan (born 28 July 1974) is a Romanian middle-distance runner. She competed in the women's 1500 metres at the 2004 Summer Olympics.

References

1974 births
Living people
Athletes (track and field) at the 2004 Summer Olympics
Romanian female middle-distance runners
Olympic athletes of Romania
Place of birth missing (living people)